Ese Brume MON  (born 20 January 1996) is a Nigerian athlete who specializes in the long jump. She is the current commonwealth champion and a three-time African senior champion in the long Jump and holds a personal best of  She currently holds the commonwealth games record, African junior record and African record in the event. She's a two-time medalist at the world athletics championship, an Olympic bronze medalist and also a five-time African junior champion in athletics.

She is also the only athlete to win three consecutive Long Jump titles at the African Championships in Athletics as well as the first African to win two Long Jump medals at the World Athletics Championships

Brume was the long jump gold medalist at the 2013 African Junior Athletics Championships, 2014 Commonwealth Games, 2014 African Senior Athletics Championships and 2015 African Junior Athletics Championships. She also represented Nigeria at the World Junior Championships in Athletics in 2014.

Brume represented Nigeria at the 2016 Olympic Games, where she placed 5th in the Long Jump final with a leap of 6.81m

Brume won the bronze medal in the Long Jump event at the 2019 World Athletics Championships in Doha, with a jump of 6.91 m and at the 2020 Summer Olympics in Tokyo, with a jump of 6.97 m.

In 2022, she became the first African woman in history to jump four legal marks over 7.00m

Career
Born in Ughelli, Delta State, Brume first emerged at the national level at the 2012 Nigerian Athletics Championships with former junior athletes Dakolo Emmanuel and Fabian Edoki. She placed sixth in the long jump, clearing over six meters. She also won the 18th National Sports Festival in Lagos. She was one of the most successful athletes at the 2013 African Junior Athletics Championships: she won the long jump title, took silver in the triple jump, and was part of Nigeria's winning 4×100 meters relay team. She also placed fourth individually in the 100 meters. Brume successfully defended her long jump title at the next edition of the African Junior Athletics Championships in Addis Ababa. This time, she was even more successful as she added the triple jump and 4 x 100 m relay title, and a bronze medal in the individual 100 meters to her collection.

She was chosen for the discipline at the 2014 World Junior Championships in Athletics but, having flown to Eugene, Oregon just a day before competing, she performed poorly and was bottom of the qualifying. The Nigerian junior women's relay team also did not fare well, being eliminated in qualifying.

Just five days later, she represented Nigeria at the 2014 Commonwealth Games. Blessing Okagbare opted to compete in the sprints, so Brume was Nigeria's sole entrant for the event. The 18-year-old excelled in the Commonwealth Games long jump, clearing  in the final to win the gold medal. Brume dedicated her victory to Emmanuel Uduaghan, Delta State's governor who invested in track and field infrastructure and support in the region. Okagbare, who won a Commonwealth sprint double, was also a product of the system, and Brume stated that she was inspired by the older athlete's achievements. As a result of her own medal feats, Brume was given an athletic scholarship to study in the United States, with local government support.

2016 
Having already secured the qualification standard for the Rio Olympics with her personal record jump in June 2016 at the Akure Golden League, Brume headed to Durban for the African Athletics Championships as the African leader in her event. She successfully defended her title from the previous championships.

Brume qualified for the Rio Olympics long jump final as the third-best athlete in her pool. This placed her in sixth position going into the final of the event. She eventually ended the competition in fifth place, leaping a distance of 6.81 meters which was just 2 centimeters shy of her personal record, which she had set earlier in the year.

2018 
Brume became a double Turkish Universities champion at the Turkey Koç Fest Universities Sports Games, representing her university, Eastern Mediterranean University. She set a meeting record, and African lead of 6.82 m at the first leg of the 2018 World Challenge series in Kingston, Jamaica. This mark remained the best jump by an African athlete until the 2018 African Championships in Athletics in Asaba. There, she increased her African lean by a centimeter to win her third consecutive African senior title. She then represented Africa at the Ostrava Continental Cup, where she placed fourth. 2018 also saw Brume defend her title at the 19th Nigerian National Sports Festival in Abuja, in a new festival record of 6.62 meters.

2019 
Brume was shortlisted as a nominee in the StarQt Award in the Africa Sportswoman of the Year category. She was the only Nigerian athlete nominated in any category. The event was held in October in Johannesburg.

She became the African Games champion in the Long Jump on 29 August 2019. This was her first African games title. On 24 July 2019, in Erzurum, she improved her personal best to 6.96m despite a very strong headwind (−2.1 m/s). At the Turkish championships in Bursa on 4 August, she broke the 7-meter barrier for the first time in her career surpassing that mark twice in the competition. Her jump of 7.05 m (+ 0.9 m/s) was the second-best African performance in history. On 6 October, she won the bronze medal in the World Championships with a jump of 6.91m. Her medal was Nigeria's only medal at the competition and a first since 2013.

2021
She broke the African Record in the long jump set by Chioma Ajunwa.

At the 2020 Summer Olympics, she won a bronze medal in the long jump event. Her medal was Nigeria's only medal in Athletics at the event and the first Athletics medal at the Olympics since 2008.

2022

At the 2022 World Athletics Indoor Championships, she won a silver medal in the long jump event, Nigeria's only medal in the competition. She also won another silver medal at the 2022 World Athletics Championships, becoming the first African to win two Long Jump medals at the World Athletics Championships At the 2022 Commonwealth Games, she won gold at the women long jump event and also broke the game record in the event with her 7.00m jump. She holds the new game record after breaking the record of Australia's Bronwyn Thompson, who previously held the record with her 6.97m jump.

Personal life
In 2021, her younger brother Godson Okeoghene Brume broke the African u-18 100-meter record with 10.13 s.

She is close friends with fellow Nigerian athlete Tobi Amusan.

National titles
 Long Jump: 2014, 2016, 2017

Personal bests
100 metres – 11.41 sec (Bursa 2019)
Long jump –  (Chula Vista, 2021)
Triple jump –  (Addis Ababa 2015)

International competition record

Alma Matar

She attended Delta State University

References

External links

Living people
1996 births
Sportspeople from Delta State
Nigerian female long jumpers
Nigerian female sprinters
Nigerian female triple jumpers
Commonwealth Games gold medallists for Nigeria
Athletes (track and field) at the 2014 Commonwealth Games
Olympic athletes of Nigeria
Athletes (track and field) at the 2016 Summer Olympics
Athletes (track and field) at the 2020 Summer Olympics
Olympic female long jumpers
Medalists at the 2020 Summer Olympics
Olympic bronze medalists for Nigeria
Olympic bronze medalists in athletics (track and field)
Commonwealth Games medallists in athletics
Athletes (track and field) at the 2019 African Games
World Athletics Championships athletes for Nigeria
World Athletics Championships medalists
African Championships in Athletics winners
African Games gold medalists in athletics (track and field)
African Games gold medalists for Nigeria
World Athletics Indoor Championships medalists
21st-century Nigerian women
Medallists at the 2014 Commonwealth Games